The 1920 Miami Redskins football team was an American football team that represented Miami University as a member of the Ohio Athletic Conference (OAC) during the 1920 college football season. In its third season under head coach George Little, Miami compiled a 5–2–1 record (3–2–1 against conference opponents) and finished in eighth place out of 17 teams in the OAC.

Schedule

References

Miami
Miami RedHawks football seasons
Miami Redskins football